Rapdalus albicolor is a moth in the family Cossidae. It was described by Yakovlev in 2006. It is found in the Philippines (Palawan, Luzon).

The length of the forewings is 16–22 mm. The forewings are yellowish-white, with dark spots. The hindwings are white with small dark strokes between the veins.

Subspecies
Rapdalus albicolor albicolor (Philippines: Palawan)
Rapdalus albicolor luzonicus Yakovlev, 2006 (Philippines: Luzon)

References

Natural History Museum Lepidoptera generic names catalog

Zeuzerinae
Moths described in 2006